Pansa Vosbein (born 31 July 1996), nicknamed Milk, is a Thai actress under GMMTV. She gained recognition from a girls' love role in the series Bad Buddy (2021).

Life

Pansa was born on 31 July 1996. She is of Chinese, Danish, Mon, and Thai ancestry. She is the fourth of five brothers and sisters.

Pansa graduated from Maejo University in Chiang Mai province.

Career

In 2018, Pansa participated in an audition called GSB Gen Campus Star 2018, organised by the magazine Campus together with the Thai Government Savings Bank. She passed the audition as one of the 23 representatives of Northern Thailand.

In 2019, Pansa got her first acting role in the music video for Ronnadet Wongsaroj's song called "Pen Arai Sak Yang".

Later, Pansa became an actress under GMMTV. Her first work with GMMTV is the girls' love role of "Ink" in the series Bad Buddy (2021), in which she was paired up with "Pa", played by Pattranite Limpatiyakorn, and which received acclaimed reviews, sending the hashtag "#อิ๊งภา" ("#InkPa") trending on social media. Pansa and Pattranite continued to take girls' love roles together in a number of series, including Vice Versa (2022), Magic of Zero (2022), and 23.5 (2023).

Filmography

Series

Films

Music videos

References

1996 births
Living people
Pansa Vosbein
Pansa Vosbein
Pansa Vosbein
Pansa Vosbein
Pansa Vosbein